Bernard Charles Henri Clavel (29 May 1923 – 5 October 2010) was a French writer.

Clavel was born in Lons-le-Saunier. From a humble background, he was largely self-educated. He began working as a pastry cook apprentice when he was 14 years old. He later had several jobs until he began working as a journalist in the 1950s. After the war, he worked for the social insurance, and he could not dedicate himself to literature until 1964. He lived and worked in many places, and was living in Savoy at the time of his death.

His first novel was L'Ouvrier de la nuit (Night Worker, 1956). He later published works for young people and numerous novels, at times organised into series: La grande patience (The Great Patience, 4 volumes — 1962–1968), Les Colonnes du ciel (Heaven's Pillars, 5 volumes — 1976–1981), or Le Royaume du nord (Northern Kingdom, 6 volumes — 1983–1989).

In his writings, he employed simple language and attached importance to humble characters and to the defence of humanist values by questioning violence and war.

He died in Grenoble.

Prizes and memberships
 Prix Goncourt for Les Fruits de l'hiver: 1968
 Member of Académie Goncourt 1971–1977.
 Member of Coordination française pour la Décennie de la culture de paix et de non-violence.
 Member of Non-Violence XXI group since 2001.

Partial bibliography
 Cargo pour l'enfer, 1993
 Malataverne, 1993
L'Arbre qui chante
Les Roses de Verdun
Collection La Grande Patience
 La Maison des autres
 Celui qui voulait voir la mer
 Le Cœur des vivants
 Les Fruits de l'hiver
Collection Les Colonnes du ciel
 La Saison des loups
 La Lumière du lac
 La Femme de guerre
 Marie Bon pain
 Compagnons du Nouveau Monde
 Collection Le Royaume du nord
 Harricana, 1983
 L'Or de la terre, 1984
 Miséréré, 1985
 Amarok, 1987
 L'Angélus du soir, 1988
 Maudits sauvages, 1989

Film adaptations  
 God's Thunder (1966), Denys de La Patellière, from the book Qui m'emporte.
 Le Voyage du père (1966), Denys de La Patellière.

Television adaptations 
 La Maison des autres (1977), Jean-Pierre Marchand Bernard Clavel.
 L'hercule sur la place.
 L'Espagnol (1967), directed by Jean Prat.
 Le Tambour du bief
 Le Silence des armes
 Malataverne
 La Bourelle
Les colonnes du ciel, adaptation by Gabriel Axel in 5 episodes of 90 minutes.

References

External links
 
 Official website
 Official website
 Bibliography

1923 births
2010 deaths
People from Lons-le-Saunier
20th-century French non-fiction writers
20th-century French male writers
Writers from Bourgogne-Franche-Comté
Prix Goncourt winners
Prix Maison de la Presse winners
Knights of the National Order of Quebec
Légion d'honneur refusals